Nectandra paranaensis is a species of plant in the family Lauraceae.

It is endemic to Paraná (state) and São Paulo (state) in Brazil.

It is a Vulnerable species, threatened by habitat loss.

References

paranaensis
Endemic flora of Brazil
Flora of Paraná (state)
Flora of São Paulo (state)
Vulnerable flora of South America
Taxonomy articles created by Polbot